Marco Engelhardt (born 2 December 1980) is a German former professional footballer who played as a defensive midfielder.

Club career
Engelhardt previously played for Karlsruher SC, 1. FC Nürnberg and 1. FC Kaiserslautern in the German top-flight. For KSC and Nürnberg he appeared also in the Second division.

International career
Engelhardt has earned three caps for the Germany national football team.

Post-playing career
After retiring as a player, Engelhardt became a scout for Werder Bremen.

Honours
1. FC Nürnberg
DFB-Pokal: 2006–07

References

External links
 
 
 
 

1980 births
Living people
People from Bad Langensalza
Association football midfielders
German footballers
Germany international footballers
Germany B international footballers
Germany under-21 international footballers
2005 FIFA Confederations Cup players
FC Rot-Weiß Erfurt players
Karlsruher SC players
1. FC Kaiserslautern players
1. FC Nürnberg players
Hallescher FC players
TSG 1899 Hoffenheim II players
Bundesliga players
2. Bundesliga players
3. Liga players
Regionalliga players
Footballers from Thuringia